Allocasuarina hystricosa is a species of plant in the sheoak family Casuarinaceae that is endemic to south-western Western Australia.

Etymology
The specific epithet hystricosa means prickly or thorny, with reference to the spiny protuberances on the cones.

Description
The species grows as a dioecious shrub up to 3 m in height. It has erect branchlets up to 30 cm in length, in contrast to its closest relative A. scleroclada which has drooping branchlets.

Distribution and habitat
The species is known only from the Esperance Plains region, near the southern coast of Western Australia, from Bandalup Hill eastwards to the Eyre Range, to north-east of Ravensthorpe. It occurs on orange, red or brown loam soils on the hills and plains, where there are outcrops of granite or limestone. It is found in mallee shrubland and heathland in association with Acacia ophiolithica, Hakea verrucosa and Allocasuarina campestris. It also forms small dense stands, sometimes with Melaleuca pauperiflora and Gahnia lanigera.

References

 

 
hystricosa
Flora of Western Australia
Plants described in 2007
Rosids of Western Australia
Fagales of Australia
Dioecious plants